Germán Julio Frers Lynch (10 September 1899 – 6 July 1986) was an Argentine sailor. He competed in the mixed 6 metres at the 1936 Summer Olympics.

References

1899 births
1986 deaths
Place of death missing
Sportspeople from Buenos Aires
Olympic sailors of Argentina
Sailors at the 1936 Summer Olympics – 6 Metre
Argentine male sailors (sport)